"Head in the Clouds" is a song by Scottish singer-songwriter and acoustic guitarist Gerry Cinnamon. It was released as a single on 13 April 2020 by Little Runaway Records as the sixth single from his second studio album The Bonny.

Background
Talking about the song, Gerry Cinnamon said it "kinda documents my nightly battles with insomnia where every few weeks everything goes tits up, as it would for most folk if they didn’t sleep for three days, but there is also a loose narrative of a kinda love story."

Charts

Release history

References

2020 songs
2020 singles
Gerry Cinnamon songs